The 40th Academy Awards were held on April 10, 1968, to honor film achievements of 1967. Originally scheduled for April 8, the awards were postponed to two days later due to the assassination of civil rights leader Martin Luther King Jr. Bob Hope was once again the host of the ceremony.

This year, due to the waning popularity of black-and-white films, Best Cinematography, Art Direction, and Costume Design, previously divided into separate awards for color and monochrome films, were merged into single categories. This was the first Oscars since 1948 to feature clips from the Best Picture nominees.

This year marked the first and only time that three different films were nominated for the "Top Five" Oscars (Picture, Director, Actor, Actress and Screenplay): Bonnie and Clyde, The Graduate and Guess Who's Coming to Dinner. While all three won major Oscars, Best Picture was awarded to Norman Jewison's thriller/mystery film, In the Heat of the Night.

The Graduate became the seventh film to win Best Director and nothing else, and the last until the 94th Academy Awards. For the first time since the introduction of the Academy Award for Best Costume Design in 1948, Edith Head did not receive a nomination, after tallying 30 nominations and 7 wins over the previous 18 years.

Due to an all-out push by Academy President Gregory Peck, 18 of the 20 acting nominees were present at the ceremony. Only Katharine Hepburn and the late Spencer Tracy, who was nominated posthumously, were missing. Edith Evans was the last performer born in the 1880s to receive an acting nomination (Best Actress, for her role in The Whisperers).

Winners and nominees

Nominations were announced on February 19, 1968. Winners are listed first, highlighted in boldface and indicated with a double dagger.

Jean Hersholt Humanitarian Award
Gregory Peck

Irving G. Thalberg Memorial Award
Alfred Hitchcock

Honorary Oscar
Arthur Freed was presented for distinguished service to the Academy and the production of six top-rated Awards telecasts.

Trivia
This was the last Oscars broadcast by network radio in the US. The ABC radio network (which had just split into four separate services) carried the ceremony over the ABC Entertainment network.
Of the 20 performers nominated in the acting categories only two didn't attend: Katharine Hepburn and Spencer Tracy. Hepburn, whose award for Best Actress was accepted by George Cukor, was in France filming The Lion in Winter, and Tracy, whose nomination was posthumous as he had passed away ten months before the ceremony occurred.
There was no Governor's Ball.
Prior to the two-day postponement, four African-American stars who were scheduled to take part in the ceremony: Sidney Poitier, Sammy Davis Jr., Louis Armstrong, and Diahann Carroll, announced they were withdrawing in mourning for Dr. King. Prior to the postponement, Jack Lemmon was announced as a replacement for Poitier, and Shirley Jones for Davis, but once the event was delayed, the original quartet returned.
Alfred Hitchcock's acceptance speech is on record as one of the shortest in Academy Awards history: "Thank you very much indeed". This is one word longer than William Holden's acceptance speech for Stalag 17 at the 26th Academy Awards, which was simply "Thank you ... thank you."
This was the only year in which two films (Bonnie and Clyde and Guess Who's Coming to Dinner) received nominations in all four acting categories.
Legendary film composer John Williams received his first nomination for scoring Valley of the Dolls. He would go on to receive 50 more nominations, winning 5.

Multiple nominations and awards

These films had multiple nominations:

10 nominations: Bonnie and Clyde and Guess Who's Coming to Dinner
9 nominations: Doctor Dolittle
7 nominations: The Graduate, In the Heat of the Night and Thoroughly Modern Millie
5 nominations: Camelot
4 nominations: Cool Hand Luke, The Dirty Dozen and In Cold Blood
2 nominations: A Place to Stand and The Taming of the Shrew

The following films received multiple awards.

5 wins: In the Heat of the Night
3 wins: Camelot
2 wins: Bonnie and Clyde, Doctor Dolittle and Guess Who's Coming to Dinner

Presenters and performers
The following individuals, listed in order of appearance, presented awards or performed musical numbers.

Presenters

Performers

See also
1967 in film
 10th Grammy Awards
 19th Primetime Emmy Awards
 20th Primetime Emmy Awards
 21st British Academy Film Awards
 22nd Tony Awards
 25th Golden Globe Awards

References

External links
 
 A Place to Stand, 1967, Archives of Ontario YouTube Channel (winner of Best Live Action Short Subject)

Academy Awards ceremonies
1967 film awards
1967 awards in the United States
1968 in California
1968 in American cinema
April 1968 events in the United States
Events in Santa Monica, California
20th century in Santa Monica, California